Kannavia  is a village in the Nicosia District of Cyprus, located near Spilia. The small hamlet Kapoura is part of the Kannavia municipality.

References

Communities in Nicosia District